The Treaty of Ripon was an agreement signed by Charles I, King of England, Scotland, and Ireland, and the Scottish Covenanters on 28 October 1640, in the aftermath of the Second Bishops' War.

The Bishops' Wars were fought by the Covenanters to oppose attempts by Charles to bring the Church of Scotland closer to the Church of England, specifically in relation to treating the king as the source of spiritual power and the introduction of bishops into government. Victory at the Battle of Newburn in August 1640 left the Scots in control of Northumberland, County Durham, and Newcastle upon Tyne. 

Seeking to bypass Parliament, Charles assembled the Great Council of Peers for the first time in a century. Although the Council agreed to negotiate, they insisted Parliament approve the terms; until then, the Scots were allowed to occupy Northumberland and Durham, and were paid expenses of £850 a day. Although humiliating, Charles was forced to accept these terms.

This forced Charles to recall the Long Parliament, which he could not dissolve, ultimately leading to the First English Civil War.

Background

National Covenant

The Protestant Reformation created a Church of Scotland, or 'kirk', Presbyterian in structure, and Calvinist in doctrine. While 'Presbyterian' and 'Episcopalian' now implies differences in both governance and doctrine, this was not the case in the 17th century. Episcopalian structures were governed by bishops, usually appointed by the monarch, Presbyterian by presbyters, elected by ministers and elders. Arguments over the role of bishops were as much about politics and the power of the monarch as religious practice.

When James VI and I succeeded as king of England in 1603, he viewed a unified Church of Scotland and England as the first step in creating a centralised, Unionist state. This policy was adopted by his son, Charles I, but the two were very different in doctrine, while English Puritans also objected to proposed reforms to the Church of England. 

In 1636, a new Book of Canons replaced John Knox's Book of Discipline and excommunicated anyone who denied the King's supremacy in church matters. Charles failed to consult either the kirk or the Scottish Parliament, and these reforms caused outrage in Scotland. When followed in 1637 by a new Book of Common Prayer, it resulted in riots, and in February 1638, representatives from all sections of Scottish society agreed a National Covenant, pledging resistance to liturgical 'innovations.' It tapped into widespread dissatisfaction with the policies advocated by a largely absentee monarch, and the loss of Scottish political influence to England. The Covenant was supported by most of the nobility, including the Marquess of Argyll and six other members of the Scottish Privy Council.

Although Charles agreed to defer discussion of the new canons to the General Assembly of the Church of Scotland, he made it clear he had no intention of making any concessions. When the Assembly gathered in Glasgow in December it rejected the changes, expelled bishops from the kirk, and affirmed its right to meet annually, not just when the king agreed. The Marquis of Hamilton advised Charles there was now no alternative to war. With the Scottish Parliament recruiting soldiers and seeking support from foreign governments and English Puritans, Charles had to treat this as an act of rebellion and responded by gathering an army to march on Scotland.

Bishops' Wars

In March 1639 Covenanter forces seized Edinburgh and other Scottish towns, starting the First Bishops' War, which ended without a battle in June by the Treaty of Berwick. Following this, Charles called the Short Parliament in April 1640, seeking funds for a second campaign; when Parliament refused to approve taxes until he had agreed to address other issues, it was dissolved after only three weeks, ahead of a debate likely to result in a petition against the war in Scotland. Instead, Charles turned to the Parliament of Ireland for funds, and planned another invasion of Scotland supported by an army from Ireland, a naval blockade of the Forth, and an uprising in the Highlands.

The success of the Covenanters in asserting the rights of Parliament in Scotland emboldened Charles' English opponents, led by John Pym, who began secret talks with the Scots. Seeking to limit royal authority in England, this group represented a much broader body of dissenters who had been alienated by Charles' policies during his over a decade-long period of Personal Rule. With this invitation, and warned about the king's plans by allies from within the English parliament, the Covenanters launched their attack on England, bypassing the heavily defended city of Berwick, starting the Second Bishops’ War. The Royal army was routed by Scottish forces at the Battle of Newburn who then occupied Newcastle which surrendered on 30 August 1640. Following this, the Scottish continued their advance south, occupying Durham and establishing an advanced line on the River Tees on 18 September.

Negotiations
With Newcastle, along with most of Northumberland and Durham, under the control of the Covenanters, Charles called a meeting of the Great Council of Peers in York, the first time this body had met for a century. The Council declined to assume the functions of Parliament, but did negotiate the treaty with the Covenanters.

Meanwhile, the Scottish army was facing shortages of supply and started collecting moneys from the nearby shires and church properties, as well as from Newcastle itself in order to pay for the continued upkeep of the army. This shortage of supplies did confer a negotiating advantage to the Covenanters though. With incidents of pillaging by soldiers already being reported, the English lords did not want to see the army become a mob living in the area of Newcastle, but Charles could not afford to pay the invaders' demands without the tax-raising powers of Parliament, making a settlement involving both king and Parliament inevitable. In collaboration with the king's opponents the Covenanters also refused to withdraw until Charles summoned the English Parliament.

Terms

Under the terms of the treaty the Scottish continued to occupy Northumberland and Durham, and were to receive expenses of £850 a day starting from 16 October paid from England, but agreed to a temporary cessation of hostilities. This situation was to continue until a full settlement was agreed. The Scottish Government was also to be reimbursed for its expenses in the war.

These terms were humiliating, but Charles was desperate to stop the Covenanters from taking York and with little support from his peers his options were limited, and he was forced to agree.

Terms were finalised on 16 October, and accepted by Charles on the 28th. Negotiations on the permanent settlement would continue until August 1641, when the  Treaty of London was signed.

Aftermath
Charles issued writs for what became known as the Long Parliament, which assembled on 3 November 1640, ending eleven years of Personal Rule. Since the Scots made it clear they would only return home once paid, and would only agree terms with Parliament, Charles was now faced with a body that he could not dissolve at will. During this time the Covenanters used their army's continued presence in England to strengthen the position of the king's English opponents.

Over the next few months, Parliament voted to ensure it could not be dissolved without its own consent, imprisoned Archbishop Laud, and executed the Earl of Strafford. Only then did it agree the Treaty of London on 10 August 1641, which agreed to pay the Scots £300,000 to cover the costs of the war. The Covenanters' army then returned to Scotland, where most of it was disbanded.

Disputes between Charles and Parliament continued to escalate, culminating in the attempted arrest of the Five Members in January 1642. Charles left London and began rallying support for his cause; the First English Civil War began on 22 August 1642.

See also
1640 in England
Timeline of the English Civil War
Wars of the Three Kingdoms
Outline of the wars of the Three Kingdoms
Scottish invasions of England

References

Sources
 
 

 
 
 
 
 
 
 
 
 
 
 
 
 
 
 
 
 
 
 
 
 

Ripon
Ripon
History of North Yorkshire
Ripon
1640 in Scotland
1640 in England
History of Ripon
Ripon
England–Scotland relations
Wars of the Three Kingdoms

ru:Епископские войны